James Scotland Symon (9 May 1911 – 30 April 1985) was a Scottish football player and manager. He also played cricket for Scotland in an age when it was possible to play and excel in several sports.

Footballer
Symon started his professional career at Dundee in 1930. He then had a three-year spell at English team Portsmouth before signing for boyhood heroes Rangers in 1938. He also won a Scotland cap in 1938 against Hungary. He only played 37 Scottish League games for Rangers but helped the club win the league title in 1939.

His career was then interrupted by the onset of World War II; during the conflict he continued to play for Rangers and made over 250 appearances in unofficial competitions (almost all of which the club won). Symon retired from playing in 1947, making his final appearance a few weeks before his 36th birthday and securing the official league championship again in his final season.

Cricketer

Symon played cricket for Scotland in 1938, taking five Australian wickets for just 33 runs.

Manager
He returned to Rangers in 1954 where he would steer them to six League championships, five Scottish Cups, and four League Cups. He also took the club into European football for the first time, guiding them to two Cup Winners Cup finals in 1961 and 1967, both ending in defeat.
  
Symon was Rangers manager when they lost to Berwick Rangers in the Scottish Cup on 28 January 1967. When Symon was sensationally sacked by Rangers in November 1967 (despite Rangers then leading the league table), he was told of the decision by an accountant.

Honours

Manager

East Fife
Scottish Division B : 1947–48
Scottish League Cup (2) : 1947–48, 1949–50
B Division Supplementary Cup (2) : 1946–47, 1947–48

Rangers
Scottish Division One (6) : 1955–56, 1956–57, 1958–59, 1960–61, 1962–63, 1963–64
Scottish Cup (5) : 1959–60, 1961–62, 1962–63, 1963–64, 1965–66
Scottish League Cup (4) : 1960–61, 1961–62, 1963–64, 1964–65

See also
List of Scottish cricket and football players

References

External links

 

1911 births
1985 deaths
Dundee F.C. players
East Fife F.C. managers
Association football wing halves
Partick Thistle F.C. managers
Footballers from Perth and Kinross
Portsmouth F.C. players
Preston North End F.C. managers
Rangers F.C. managers
Rangers F.C. players
Scottish footballers
Scottish Football League players
Scottish football managers
Scotland international footballers
English Football League players
Scottish Football League managers
Scottish Football Hall of Fame inductees
Dundee Violet F.C. players
Scottish Junior Football Association players
Scotland junior international footballers